A statue of Louis XVI by Achille Valois arrived in Louisville, Kentucky, in December 1966 and was installed in July 1967, before being removed "due to safety concerns" in September 2020.

Description

History 
The statue's first home was the town square of Montpellier, France, in 1829. There, it was reviled and toppled over in less than year. It was then moved to a military dungeon and stayed there until it was discovered by an officer taking inventory in 1899. In 1966, Montpellier decided to give the statue to Louisville, Kentucky, since the city is named after Louis XVI. It was shipped on a U.S. Navy ship to Norfolk, Virginia, where it sat for a week in Naval Station Pier 2 in late 1966. The statue was then put on a train and made it to Louisville on Christmas Day 1966. The mayor of Louisville at the time, Kenneth Schmied, is quoted as saying, "It's a great Christmas present for our city."

See also
 List of monuments and memorials removed during the George Floyd protests

References

1829 establishments in France
1830 disestablishments in France
1966 establishments in Kentucky
Buildings and structures in Louisville, Kentucky
Cultural depictions of Louis XVI
France–United States relations
Montpellier
Monuments and memorials in Kentucky
Monuments and memorials removed during the George Floyd protests
Outdoor sculptures in Kentucky
Relocated buildings and structures in Kentucky
Sculptures of men in Kentucky
Statues in Kentucky
Statues removed in 2020